Nantou County (Hokkien POJ: Lâm-tâu-koān; Hakka PFS: Nàm-thèu-yen) is the second largest county of Taiwan by area, located in the central part of the country. It is also the only non-coastal county in Taiwan. Its name derives from the Hoanya Taiwanese aboriginal word Ramtau.

Its mountainous area makes it a tourist destination; Sun Moon Lake is located in this county. Other well-known tourist sites of the county including Aowanda, Formosan Aboriginal Culture Village, Hehuanshan, Paper Dome, Qingjing Farm, Shanlinxi, Shuiyuan Suspension Bridge and Xitou. Notable cities in Nantou are Nantou City and Puli Town. The official butterfly of Nantou County is the broad-tailed swallowtail butterfly (Agehana maraho). Nantou's tung-ting tea is one of the most famous and high-quality oolong teas grown in Taiwan.

History

Early history
Before the arrival of Han Chinese to Nantou, the Atayal, Bunun and Tsou tribes were distributed throughout the northern and central Nantou. These groups pioneered the early development of mountain regions in Nantou.

Kingdom of Tungning
The Han Chinese began to enter Nantou via two main routes, the Zhuoshui River and Maoluo River.

Japanese rule
In 1901, during Japanese rule,  was one of twenty local administrative offices established. A major reorganization occurred in 1920, in which the area was administered under Taichū Prefecture together with modern-day Changhua County and Taichung City.

Republic of China
After the handover of Taiwan from Japan to the Republic of China on 25 October 1945, the present day area of Nantou County was administered under Taichung County of Taiwan Province. On 16 August 1950, Nantou County was established by its separation from Taichung County, and Nantou Township was designed as the county seat. On 1 July 1957, the Zhongxing New Village in Nantou Township was designed to be the capital of Taiwan Province from the former Taipei City. In 1981, the county seat was upgraded from Nantou Township to Nantou City. The Chi-Chi earthquake occurred in 1999.

Geography

It is the second largest county in Taiwan after Hualien County.

There are 41 mountains with peaks over 3,000 meters high, with Mount Yu in Xinyi Township is the highest peak in Nantou County and in Taiwan with a height of 3,952 meters. Around 83% of Nantou County area is covered by hills and mountains.

Rain that falls into the mountains area converge into the Dadu River and Zhuoshui River. There are inland ponds and lakes throughout the mountains in the county, such as the Sun Moon Lake, Bi Pond, Liyu Pond and Cilin Pond.

Climate
The rainy season lasts from April to September and the dry season lasts from October to March.

Government

Nantou County consists of 1 city, 4 urban townships, 6 rural townships, 2 mountain indigenous townships, 128 villages and 133 neighborhoods. Nantou City is the seat of the county which houses the Nantou County Government and Nantou County Council. The incumbent Magistrate of Nantou County is Lin Ming-chen of the Kuomintang.

Administrative divisions

Colors indicate statutory language status of Hakka and Formosan languages in the respective subdivisions.

Politics
南投縣 Nantou County voted two Kuomintang legislators out of two seats to be in the Legislative Yuan during the 2016 Republic of China legislative election.

Demographics and culture

Population
Nantou County has a population of 479,666 people as of January 2023.
 The following information is as of January 2023 資料

 The population growth and decline is calculated by subtracting the population of the previous month from the current month’s population. Negative values are represented by red letters, positive values are represented by blue letters, and no growth is represented by green letters.
 The population density of each district is calculated by rounding 4 to 5 to 1 decimal place
 Population growth：
 高度成長 High growth    （年成長率高於1%）      ：NA（updated 2020）
 穩定成長 Steady growth  （年成長率0.1%~1%）    ：草屯 Caotun
 成長停滯 Stagnant growth（年成長率±0.1%）      ：NA（updated 2020）
 輕度流失 Mild loss      （年成長率-0.5%~-0.1%）：南投、仁愛
 中度流失 Moderate Churn （年成長率-1%~-0.5%）  ：埔里Puli、名間、魚池
 高度流失 High churn     （年成長率-2%~-1%）    ：鹿谷、竹山、中寮、信義、水里、集集
 嚴重流失 Severe drain   （年成長率低於-2%）    ：國姓

Language
The official language of the county is Mandarin. Taiwanese Hokkien, Hakka, English and aboriginal languages are also spoken.

Economy

Due to its landlock nature, the county's economy depends mainly on agriculture. Other important industries in the county are forestry, fishery and animal husbandry. It also includes tourism and manufacturing industries. As of 2016, there are 28,000 registered businesses and 5,205 registered companies in the county with a total capital of NT$5,609 million and NT$80,024 million respectively. As of 2015, there were 938 factories operating in the county.

Education

There are 2 colleges, 13 senior high and vocational schools, 30 junior high schools, 149 elementary schools, 106 kindergartens and 84 day care centers in the county. Notable universities in the county are National Chi Nan University, National Chung Hsing University and Nan Kai University of Technology.

Energy

Nantou County houses Taiwan's first pumped-storage hydroelectric power plant, the Takuan Pumped Storage Hydro Power Plant commissioned in 1985 with an installed capacity of 1,008 MW. It also houses Taiwan's largest pumped-storage hydroelectric power plant, the Mingtan Pumped Storage Hydro Power Plant with an installed capacity of 1,602 MW. Both power plants are located in Shuili Township along the Shuili River.

Sports
Notable sporting events held by Nantou County include:
 2003 Asian Canoe Slalom Championships
 2011 Asian Women's Softball Championship
 2013 Asian Canoe Slalom Championships

Tourist attractions

 Chung Tai Chan Monastery
 Ci En Pagoda
 Paper Dome
 Fonghuanggu Bird and Ecology Park
 Formosan Aboriginal Culture Village
 Geographic center of Taiwan
 Jufang Hall
 Lalu Island
 Ming Shan Resort
 Nantou County Culture Park
 Qingjing Farm
 Shanlinxi Forest Recreation Area
 Shuiyuan Suspension Bridge
 Sun Moon Lake
 Sun Moon Lake Wen Wu Temple
 Taroko National Park
 Wushe Incident Memorial Park
 Xitou Nature Education Area
 Xuanzang Temple
 Yushan National Park
 Zhushan Zinan Temple

Transportation

Rail

Taiwan Railways Administration
Nantou County is served by the Jiji Line of Taiwan Railways which consists of Zhuoshui, Longquan, Jiji, Shuili and Checheng railway stations.

Taiwan High Speed Rail
Although Nantou County does not have a high speed rail station, high speed rail can be accessed by bus to Taichung HSR station.

See also
 Administrative divisions of the Republic of China

References

External links

 Nantou County Government